LaMoure County is a county in the U.S. state of North Dakota. As of the 2020 census, the population was 4,093. Its county seat is LaMoure.

History
The Dakota Territory legislature created the county on January 4, 1873, with Grand Rapids as the county seat. However, the county organization was not completed at that time, nor was the county attached to another county for administrative and judicial purposes. It was named for Judson LaMoure, a member of the territorial/state legislature from 1872 to 1918.

The county organization was effected on October 27, 1881. Its boundaries were altered in February 1881 and in March 1883. It has retained its present boundary since that time. The present county seat, LaMoure, was founded in 1882, and the county seat was transferred to that community soon after.

Geography
The James River flows southeasterly through the central portion of LaMoure County, and a tributary of the South Branch Maple River flows southerly from the center of the county. The county terrain consists of rolling hills, mostly devoted to agriculture. The terrain slopes to the south and east; its highest point is on its upper west boundary line at 2,047' (624m) ASL.

LaMoure County hosts a Navy transmitter, the Naval Radio Transmitter Facility LaMoure.

Major highways

  U.S. Highway 281
  North Dakota Highway 1
  North Dakota Highway 13
  North Dakota Highway 46
  North Dakota Highway 56

Airports
 Kulm Municipal Airport  - public use airport NE of Kulm.

Adjacent counties

 Stutsman County - north
 Barnes County - northeast
 Ransom County - east
 Dickey County - south
 McIntosh County - southwest
 Logan County - west

National protected area
 Bone Hill National Wildlife Refuge

Lakes

 Bone Hill Creek Lake
 Cottonwood Lake
 Lake Lamoure
 Pearl Lake
 Wild Rice Slough

Demographics

2000 census
As of the 2000 census, there were 4,701 people, 1,942 households, and 1,308 families in the county. The population density was 4 people per square mile (2/km2).  There were 2,271 housing units at an average density of 2 per square mile (1/km2). The racial makeup of the county was 99.23% White, 0.02% African American, 0.17% Native American, 0.13% Asian, 0.00% Pacific Islander, 0.11% from other races, and 0.34% from two or more races. 0.55% of the population were Hispanic or Latino of any race. 50.7% were of German, 22.8% Norwegian and 5.5% Swedish ancestry.

There were 1,942 households, out of which 27.50% had children under the age of 18 living with them, 60.50% were married couples living together, 4.00% had a female householder with no husband present, and 32.60% were non-families. 30.80% of all households were made up of individuals, and 16.60% had someone living alone who was 65 years of age or older. The average household size was 2.38 and the average family size was 2.99.

The county population contained 24.20% under the age of 18, 5.40% from 18 to 24, 23.00% from 25 to 44, 24.00% from 45 to 64, and 23.40% who were 65 years of age or older. The median age was 43 years. For every 100 females there were 102.40 males. For every 100 females age 18 and over, there were 100.70 males.

The median income for a household in the county was $29,707, and the median income for a family was $36,495. Males had a median income of $26,351 versus $17,500 for females. The per capita income for the county was $17,059.  14.70% of the population and 12.30% of families were below the poverty line.  Out of the total people living in poverty, 16.30% are under the age of 18 and 12.90% are 65 or older.

2010 census
As of the 2010 census, there were 4,139 people, 1,825 households, and 1,182 families in the county. The population density was 3.61/sqmi (1.39/km2). There were 2,238 housing units at an average density of 1.95/sqmi (0.75/km2). The racial makeup of the county was 98.5% white, 0.4% American Indian, 0.1% black or African American, 0.1% Asian, 0.2% from other races, and 0.6% from two or more races. Those of Hispanic or Latino origin made up 0.8% of the population. In terms of ancestry, 63.0% were German, 27.6% were Norwegian, 6.2% were Swedish, 6.1% were Russian, 6.0% were English, and 2.8% were American.

Of the 1,825 households, 22.8% had children under the age of 18 living with them, 56.9% were married couples living together, 4.6% had a female householder with no husband present, 35.2% were non-families, and 32.7% of all households were made up of individuals. The average household size was 2.23 and the average family size was 2.82. The median age was 49.2 years.

The median income for a household in the county was $46,098 and the median income for a family was $60,932. Males had a median income of $41,250 versus $25,172 for females. The per capita income for the county was $27,056. About 6.8% of families and 9.1% of the population were below the poverty line, including 6.8% of those under age 18 and 16.9% of those age 65 or over.

Communities

Cities

 Berlin
 Dickey
 Edgeley
 Jud
 Kulm
 LaMoure (county seat)
 Marion
 Verona

Unincorporated communities

 Alfred
 Diesem
 Medberry
 Nortonville

Townships

 Adrian
 Badger
 Black Loam
 Bluebird
 Dean
 Gladstone
 Glen
 Glenmore
 Golden Glen
 Grand Rapids
 Grandview
 Greenville
 Henrietta
 Kennison
 Mikkelson
 Nora
 Norden
 Ovid
 Pearl Lake
 Pomona View
 Prairie
 Raney
 Ray
 Roscoe
 Russell
 Ryan
 Saratoga
 Sheridan
 Swede
 Wano
 Willowbank

Ghost town
 Alfred

U.S. Navy ships
The United States Navy commissioned two tank landing ships named for the county. The first, USS La Moure County (LST-883), was commissioned January 23, 1945, and served until December 7, 1959. The second, USS La Moure County (LST-1194), was commissioned December 1, 1971 and served until November 17, 2000.

Politics
LaMoure County voters are traditionally Republican. In only one national election since 1936 has the county selected the Democratic Party candidate (as of 2020).

See also
 National Register of Historic Places listings in LaMoure County, North Dakota

References

External links
 LaMoure County bicentennial celebration : July 2, 3, 4, 5, 1976, Memorial Park, Grand Rapids, N.D. from the *Digital Horizons website
 In the valley of the Jim (1937) from the Digital Horizons website
 LaMoure County Chamber of Commerce
 LaMoure County map, North Dakota DOT

 
1881 establishments in Dakota Territory
Populated places established in 1881